Nederlands met Gebaren (NmG), or Signed Dutch, is a manually coded form of Dutch, using the signs of Dutch Sign Language, that is used for pedagogical purposes in the Netherlands.

Dutch
Dutch language